Hans F. Weinberger (September 27, 1928 in Vienna - September 15, 2017 in Durham, North Carolina) was an Austrian-American mathematician, known for his contributions
to variational methods for eigenvalue problems, partial differential equations, and fluid dynamics.

He obtained an M.S. in physics from Carnegie Institute of Technology (1948) where he also got his Sc.D. on the
thesis Fourier Transforms of Moebius Series advised by Richard Duffin (1950).
He then worked at the institute for Fluid Dynamics at University of Maryland, College Park (1950–60),
and as professor at University of Minnesota (1961–98) where he was department head (1967–69) and
now is Professor Emeritus (1998–).  Weinberger was the first director of Institute for Mathematics and its Applications (1981–87). Weinberger served as the IMA's first director from 1982 to 1987, and under his leadership, the IMA quickly became known for cutting-edge scientific programs, a collaborative atmosphere, and as a training ground for postdoctoral researchers. During his tenure, Weinberger was very engaged in scientific life at the IMA, attending lectures and collaborating with visitors and postdocs. His presence at these lectures usually meant that the toughest and most penetrating questions were asked.

While well known for his contributions to the analysis of partial differential equations, especially eigenvalue problems, Weinberger turned his attention to mathematical biology later in his career. He remained active in research throughout his life and authored several papers after his retirement in 1998. Weinberger was elected a member of the American Academy of Arts and Sciences in 1986 and was in the inaugural class of the American Mathematical Society Fellows in 2012 American Mathematical Society.

Selected articles

with J. B. Diaz: 

with M. H. Protter:

Books
A First Course in Partial Differential Equations (Dover, 1995)
Maximum Principles in Differential Equations (Prentice-Hall, 1967; Springer, 1985).  With Murray H. Protter.
Variational Methods for Eigenvalue Approximation, C.B.M.S. Regional Conference Series in Applied Mathematics #15, S.I.A.M., Philadelphia, 1974.

See also 

 Davis–Kahan–Weinberger dilation theorem

References

20th-century American mathematicians
Austrian mathematicians
Carnegie Mellon University alumni
University of Maryland, College Park faculty
University of Minnesota faculty
American people of Austrian descent
Scientists from Vienna
Fellows of the American Mathematical Society
1928 births
2017 deaths